Libnotes is a genus of crane fly in the family Limoniidae.

Distribution
The genus is primaraily found in Africa, and Asia.

Species
Subgenus Afrolimonia Alexander, 1965
L. angustilamina (Alexander, 1956)
L. basilewskyi (Alexander, 1962)
L. buxtoniana (Alexander, 1956)
L. comoreana (Alexander, 1959)
L. crassibasis (Alexander, 1975)
L. discobolina (Edwards, 1923)
L. discobolodes (Alexander, 1974)
L. dispar (Lindner, 1958)
L. ditior (Alexander, 1946)
L. familiaris (Speiser, 1923)
L. igalensis (Alexander, 1937)
L. illiterata (Alexander, 1937)
L. imperspicua (Alexander, 1929)
L. indra (Alexander, 1968)
L. irrorata (Enderlein, 1912)
L. joanae (Alexander, 1975)
L. ladogensis (Lackschewitz, 1940)
L. lophema (Alexander, 1958)
L. loveridgei (Alexander, 1937)
L. lucrativa (Alexander, 1956)
L. nigricaulis (Alexander, 1956)
L. nyasaensis (Alexander, 1920)
L. obuduensis (Alexander, 1976)
L. oligacantha (Alexander, 1956)
L. oligospilota (Alexander, 1937)
L. omnifulva (Alexander, 1957)
L. oresitropha (Speiser, 1909)
L. plutonis (Alexander, 1924)
L. poecila (Alexander, 1920)
L. praetor (Alexander, 1945)
L. rhanteria (Alexander, 1920)
L. rhizosema (Speiser, 1909)
L. shawi (Alexander, 1921)
L. sokotrana (Alexander, 1920)
L. subapicalis (Alexander, 1930)
L. trunculata (Alexander, 1976)
L. uniflava (Riedel, 1914)
L. vilhelmi (Alexander, 1924)
Subgenus Goniodineura van der Wulp, 1895
L. acrophaea (Alexander, 1930)
L. apicifusca (Alexander, 1978)
L. apsellia (Alexander, 1978)
L. banahaoensis (Alexander, 1929)
L. bellula (Alexander, 1931)
L. cerinella (Alexander, 1978)
L. circumscripta (Alexander, 1934)
L. clauda (Alexander, 1937)
L. clitelligera (Alexander, 1929)
L. delicatior (Alexander, 1940)
L. ephippiata (Alexander, 1936)
L. erythromera (Alexander, 1935)
L. familiaris Osten Sacken, 1882
L. forcipata de Meijere, 1911
L. hassenana (Alexander, 1930)
L. hopkinsi Edwards, 1928
L. imbellis (Alexander, 1924)
L. immetata (Alexander, 1935)
L. indica (Brunetti, 1912)
L. kraussiana (Alexander, 1972)
L. lacrimula (Alexander, 1956)
L. lantauensis (Alexander, 1938)
L. luteithorax (Alexander, 1937)
L. magnisiva (Alexander, 1968)
L. malaitae (Alexander, 1978)
L. melancholica (Alexander, 1931)
L. montivagans Alexander, 1915
L. neofamiliaris (Alexander, 1931)
L. nepalica (Alexander, 1958)
L. nesopicta (Alexander, 1940)
L. nigriceps (van der Wulp, 1895)
L. nigricornis Alexander, 1915
L. novaebrittanicae (Alexander, 1924)
L. parvistigma Alexander, 1920
L. perluteola (Alexander, 1972)
L. perparvula (Alexander, 1931)
L. perparvuloides (Alexander, 1935)
L. phaeonota (Alexander, 1940)
L. phaeozoma (Alexander, 1972)
L. pictoides (Alexander, 1972)
L. rarissima (Alexander, 1934)
L. signaticollis (van der Wulp, 1895)
L. siva (Alexander, 1971)
L. subfamiliaris (Alexander, 1931)
L. unistriolata (Alexander, 1931)
L. veitchi (Alexander, 1924)
L. viridula (Alexander, 1922)
Subgenus Gressittomyia Alexander, 1936
L. xenoptera (Alexander, 1936)
Subgenus Laosa Edwards, 1926
L. bipartita (Alexander, 1936)
L. charmosyne (Alexander, 1958)
L. diphragma (Alexander, 1934)
L. dolonigra (Alexander, 1956)
L. falcata (Alexander, 1935)
L. fuscinervis Brunetti, 1912
L. impensa (Alexander, 1967)
L. innuba (Alexander, 1941)
L. iris (Alexander, 1950)
L. joculator (Alexander, 1959)
L. kariyana (Alexander, 1947)
L. manobo (Alexander, 1931)
L. noctipes (Alexander, 1967)
L. pavo (Alexander, 1964)
L. regalis Edwards, 1916
L. riedelella (Alexander, 1934)
L. rotundifolialeos (Young, 1990)
L. suffalcata (Alexander, 1964)
L. taficola (Alexander, 1948)
L. transversalis de Meijere, 1916
Subgenus Libnotes Westwood, 1876
L. adicia (Alexander, 1948)
L. alexanderi Edwards, 1925
L. alternimacula (Alexander, 1962)
L. amatrix (Alexander, 1922)
L. aptata (Alexander, 1949)
L. archboldeana (Alexander, 1959)
L. astuta (Alexander, 1932)
L. atroguttata (Edwards, 1932)
L. augustana (Alexander, 1978)
L. aurantiaca (Doleschall, 1859)
L. basistrigata (Alexander, 1934)
L. buruicola (Alexander, 1942)
L. carbonipes (Alexander, 1930)
L. chrysophaea (Alexander, 1934)
L. citrivena (Alexander, 1938)
L. clintoni (Alexander, 1936)
L. colossus (Alexander, 1971)
L. comissabunda (Alexander, 1935)
L. consona (Alexander, 1936)
L. crocea (Edwards, 1916)
L. depicta (Alexander, 1942)
L. diaphana (Alexander, 1942)
L. divaricata (Alexander, 1924)
L. djampangensis (Alexander, 1934)
L. duyagi (Alexander, 1929)
L. eboracensis (Alexander, 1935)
L. elachista (Alexander, 1971)
L. elata (Alexander, 1931)
L. elissa (Alexander, 1947)
L. falsa (Alexander, 1935)
L. fastosa (Alexander, 1959)
L. ferruginata Edwards, 1926
L. flavipalpis Edwards, 1926
L. fuscicoxata (Edwards, 1932)
L. garoensis (Alexander, 1921)
L. grammoneura (Alexander, 1962)
L. greeni Edwards, 1928
L. greenwoodi Alexander, 1924
L. griseola (Alexander, 1934)
L. henrici (Alexander, 1932)
L. hollandi (Alexander, 1936)
L. howensis Alexander, 1922
L. igorata (Alexander, 1929)
L. illecebrosa (Alexander, 1930)
L. imponens (Walker, 1859)
L. impressa (Walker, 1856)
L. inattenta (Alexander, 1967)
L. infumosa Savchenko, 1983
L. innotabilis (Walker, 1864)
L. inusitata Edwards, 1927
L. invicta (Alexander, 1964)
L. ishana (Alexander, 1967)
L. kaulbackiana (Alexander, 1963)
L. kinabaluana (Edwards, 1933)
L. klossi Alexander, 1927
L. kusaiensis (Alexander, 1940)
L. laetinota (Alexander, 1963)
L. laterospinosa (Alexander, 1972)
L. libnotina (Alexander, 1934)
L. limpida Edwards, 1916
L. longinervis (Brunetti, 1912)
L. longistigma Alexander, 1921
L. luteiventris Edwards, 1926
L. majorina (Alexander, 1972)
L. marginalis Bezzi, 1916
L. megalops Edwards, 1926
L. minyneura (Alexander, 1978)
L. muscicola (Alexander, 1942)
L. neopleuralis (Alexander, 1964)
L. neosolicita (Alexander & Alexander, 1973)
L. nerissa (Alexander, 1959)
L. nigerrima (Alexander, 1934)
L. nohirai Alexander, 1918
L. notata van der Wulp, 1878
L. notatinervis Brunetti, 1912
L. onobana (Alexander, 1936)
L. opaca Bezzi, 1916
L. oralis Edwards, 1928
L. palaeta (Alexander, 1942)
L. perkinsi (Grimshaw, 1901)
L. perplexa (Alexander, 1951)
L. perrara (Alexander, 1931)
L. philemon (Alexander, 1962)
L. pilulifera (Edwards, 1933)
L. plomleyi (Alexander, 1937)
L. poeciloptera Osten Sacken, 1881
L. praeculta (Alexander, 1959)
L. pramatha (Alexander, 1965)
L. puella Alexander, 1925
L. punctatinervis Edwards, 1928
L. punctatissima de Meijere, 1915
L. punctithorax (Brunetti, 1918)
L. quadrifurca (Walker, 1861)
L. quadriplagiata Alexander, 1932
L. quinquecostata (Alexander, 1936)
L. quinquegeminata (Alexander, 1950)
L. recta (Edwards, 1928)
L. rectangula (Riedel, 1921)
L. recurvinervis (Alexander, 1930)
L. regina Alexander, 1920
L. restricta Alexander, 1924
L. riverai (Alexander, 1929)
L. rufata (Edwards, 1931)
L. rufula (Alexander, 1962)
L. sabroskyi (Alexander, 1972)
L. sackenina (Alexander, 1929)
L. sappho (Alexander, 1943)
L. scoliacantha (Alexander, 1972)
L. scutellata Edwards, 1916
L. semperi Osten Sacken, 1882
L. sharva (Alexander, 1965)
L. simplicicercus (Alexander, 1967)
L. soembana (Edwards, 1932)
L. stantoni Edwards, 1916
L. strigivena (Walker, 1861)
L. subamatrix (Alexander, 1960)
L. subfasciatula (Oosterbroek, 1986)
L. subocellata (Alexander, 1959)
L. subopaca Alexander, 1923
L. sumatrana Edwards, 1919
L. suttoni (Alexander, 1935)
L. tartarus (Alexander, 1965)
L. termitina Osten Sacken, 1882
L. terraereginae Alexander, 1922
L. thwaitesiana Westwood, 1876
L. thyestes (Alexander, 1950)
L. tibiocincta (Alexander, 1964)
L. trifasciata Edwards, 1928
L. trisignata (Walker, 1865)
L. tritincta (Brunetti, 1918)
L. trukensis (Alexander, 1972)
L. tszi (Alexander, 1949)
L. undulata Matsumura, 1916
L. univibrissa (Alexander, 1967)
L. viridicolor (Alexander, 1962)
L. vitiana (Alexander, 1956)
L. willowsi (Alexander, 1936)
L. xanthoneura (Alexander, 1953)
L. zelota (Alexander, 1933)
Subgenus Metalibnotes Alexander, 1972
L. beardsleyi (Alexander, 1972)
L. caledoniana (Alexander, 1978)
L. delandi (Alexander, 1934)
L. edgari (Alexander, 1972)
L. fijiensis (Alexander, 1914)
L. hebridensis Edwards, 1927
L. jocularis (Alexander, 1940)
L. knighti (Alexander, 1978)
L. orofenaae (Alexander, 1947)
L. perhyalina (Alexander, 1973)
L. persetosa (Alexander, 1956)
L. semiermis (Alexander, 1921)
L. sentifera (Alexander, 1972)
L. tongana (Alexander, 1978)
L. toxopei (Edwards, 1926)
L. veitchiana Edwards, 1924
L. watti (Alexander, 1973)
Subgenus Paralibnotes Alexander, 1972
L. biprotensa (Alexander, 1972)
L. immaculipennis Senior-White, 1922
L. manni Alexander, 1924
L. obliqua Alexander, 1922
L. samoensis Alexander, 1921
L. subaequalis Alexander, 1921
Subgenus Paralibnotes Alexander, 1972
L. bidentata (Skuse, 1890)
L. bidentoides (Alexander, 1972)
L. brunettii (Alexander, 1921)
L. centralis (Brunetti, 1912)
L. mopsa (Alexander, 1934)

References

Limoniidae
Nematocera genera
Diptera of Africa
Diptera of Asia